Insane Coaster Wars is an American television series broadcast by Travel Channel that premiered on July 8, 2012, and has three completed seasons. Each episode is based on a certain roller coaster category and features four coasters per category. Before the series began, Travel Channel announced the four roller coasters in each category and allowed voters to decide which one is the best. At the end of each episode, the ride with the most votes would be the winner.

Season one

Winners

Season two 

In September 2012, it was announced that Travel Channel would start filming and producing a second season of Insane Coaster Wars given the subtitle World Domination. Three coasters were confirmed for inclusion ahead of the second season; Behemoth and Leviathan at Canada's Wonderland, and Crystal Wing at Happy Valley Beijing. Season two premiered on June 9, 2013.

Winners

Season three 

In April 2014, it was announced that Travel Channel would begin airing season three of Insane Coaster Wars on June 29, 2014.

Winners

References

Travel Channel original programming
2010s American documentary television series
2012 American television series debuts
2012 American television series endings